In real analysis, the projectively extended real line (also called the one-point compactification of the real line), is the extension of the set of the real numbers, by a point denoted . More precisely, the point at infinity is the limit of every sequence of real numbers whose absolute values are increasing and unbounded.

Dividing by zero

Unlike most mathematical models of numbers, this structure allows division by zero:

for nonzero a. The structure, however, is not a field, and none of the binary arithmetic operations are total – for example,  is undefined, even though the reciprocal is total.

Extensions of the real line

The projectively extended real line extends the field of real numbers in the same way that the Riemann sphere extends the field of complex numbers, by adding a single point called conventionally .

Order

Given a number , there is no convincing argument to define either  or that .

Geometry

Fundamental to the idea that ∞ is a point no different from any other is the way the real projective line is a homogeneous space, in fact homeomorphic to a circle. For example the general linear group of 2 × 2 real invertible matrices has a transitive action on it. The group action may be expressed by Möbius transformations (also called linear fractional transformations), with the understanding that when the denominator of the linear fractional transformation is 0, the image is ∞.

The detailed analysis of the action shows that for any three distinct points P, Q and R, there is a linear fractional transformation taking P to 0, Q to 1, and R to ∞ that is, the group of linear fractional transformations is triply transitive on the real projective line. This cannot be extended to 4-tuples of points, because the cross-ratio is invariant.

Arithmetic operations

Motivation for arithmetic operations
The arithmetic operations on this space are an extension of the same operations on reals. A motivation for the new definitions is the limits of functions of real numbers.

Arithmetic operations that are defined

Arithmetic operations that are left undefined
The following expressions cannot be motivated by considering limits of real functions, and no definition of them allows the statement of the standard algebraic properties to be retained unchanged in form for all defined cases. Consequently, they are left undefined:

Algebraic properties
The following equalities mean: Either both sides are undefined, or both sides are defined and equal. This is true for any 

The following is true whenever the right-hand side is defined, for any 

Intervals and topology
However, since it is not an ordered set, the interval has a slightly different meaning. The definitions for closed intervals are as follows (it is assumed that 
):

With the exception of when the end-points are equal, the corresponding open and half-open intervals are defined by removing the respective endpoints. This redefinition is useful in interval arithmetic when dividing by an interval containing 0.

 and the empty set are also intervals, as is  excluding any single point.

As said, the topology is homeomorphic to a circle. Thus it is metrizable corresponding (for a given homeomorphism) to the ordinary metric on this circle (either measured straight or along the circle). There is no metric which is an extension of the ordinary metric on

Interval arithmetic
The result of an arithmetic operation on intervals is always an interval, except when the intervals with a binary operation contain incompatible values leading to an undefined result. In particular, we have, for every :

irrespective of whether either interval includes  and

Calculus
The definitions are motivated by the topology of this space.

Neighbourhoods
 is a neighbourhood of x, if A contains an open interval B that contains .

Limits

Basic definitions of limits

The limit of f&hairsp;(x) as x approaches p is L, denoted

if and only if for every neighbourhood A of L, there is a punctured neighbourhood B of p, such that  implies .

The one-sided limit of f&hairsp;(x) as x approaches p from the right (left) is L, denoted

if and only if for every neighbourhood A of L, there is a right-sided (left-sided) punctured neighbourhood B of p, such that  implies 

Comparison with limits in 
The definitions given above can be compared with the usual definitions of limits of real functions. In the following statements,  the first limit is as defined above, and the second limit is in the usual sense:
 is equivalent to 
 is equivalent to 
 is equivalent to 
 is equivalent to 
 is equivalent to 
 is equivalent to

Extended definition of limits
Let . Then p is a limit point of A if and only if every neighbourhood of p includes a point  such that 

Let , p a limit point of A. The limit of f&hairsp;(x) as x approaches p through A is L, if and only if for every neighbourhood B of L, there is a punctured neighbourhood C of p, such that  implies 

Continuity

The function
 

If  the function
 

Also, if the tangent function  is extended so that
 
then  is continuous in  but cannot be prolongated further to a function that is continuous in 

Many elementary functions that are continuous in  cannot be prolongated to functions that are continuous in  This is the case, for example, of the exponential function and all trigonometric functions. For example, the sine function is continuous in  but it cannot be made continuous at  As seen above, the tangent function can be prolongated to a function that is continuous in  but this function cannot be made continuous at 

As a projective range

When the real projective line is considered in the context of the real projective plane, then the consequences of Desargues' theorem are implicit. In particular, the construction of the projective harmonic conjugate relation between points is part of the structure of the real projective line. For instance, given any pair of points, the point at infinity is the projective harmonic conjugate of their midpoint.

As projectivities preserve the harmonic relation, they form the automorphisms of the real projective line. The projectivities are described algebraically as homographies, since the real numbers form a ring, according to the general construction of a projective line over a ring. Collectively they form the group PGL(2,R).

The projectivities which are their own inverses are called involutions. A hyperbolic involution has two fixed points. Two of these correspond to elementary, arithmetic operations on the real projective line: negation and reciprocation. Indeed, 0 and ∞ are fixed under negation, while 1 and −1 are fixed under reciprocation.

See also 
 Real projective plane
 Complex projective plane
 Wheel theory

Notes

References

Real analysis
Topological spaces
Projective geometry
Infinity